Leslie Stephen "Teacher" Palmer,  (born 21 August 1943), is a Trinidadian community activist, writer and teacher, who migrated in the 1960s to the UK, where he became involved in music and the arts in West London. He is credited with developing a successful template for the Notting Hill Carnival, of which he was director from 1973 to 1975, during which time he "completely revolutionised the event and transformed its structure and content almost beyond recognition." He is also known by the name of "The Wounded Soldier" as a kaisonian.

Background
Born in Tunapuna, Trinidad, in 1943, Leslie Palmer migrated to England in 1964 at the age of 21. At first he settled in the Kensal Rise area of London, and helped to form the Blue Notes Steel Orchestra in Ladbroke Grove. He trained as a teacher in Liverpool (thereafter acquiring the nickname by which he became affectionately known).

Involvement with Notting Hill Carnival
Palmer participated in the annual Notting Hill Carnival street festivities since its inaugural event in 1966,<ref>Leslie Palmer, Samuel Fishwick, "Leslie Palmer: Notting Hill Carnival is for people to be whoever they want for the day", Evening Standard, 24 August 2018.</ref> and had also been back to Trinidad to study the organisation and artistic forms of the carnival tradition there.Ashley Dawson, Mongrel Nation: Diasporic Culture and the Making of Postcolonial Britain, University of Michigan Press, 2007, p. 79. He had been thinking of how the London event could be improved, by broadening it to make it more inclusive of all the Caribbean islands as well as of British-born black youth, and he was given the opportunity to begin implementing his plans after taking on the role of carnival organiser in 1973. Anthony Perry, former director of the North Kensington Amenity Trust, who provided Palmer with premises from which to operate at 3 Acklam Road,Tom Vague, "Acklam Road and the Carnival", The Underground Map."1973 Remembered Celebrating the Birth of the Notting Hill Carnival as we know it today...", Panpodium, 6 August 2013. has said: "I don’t think there was a Notting Hill Carnival as the world knows it until 1973 when Leslie Palmer really put some juice into it and turned it into an all-island event". In the words of Tom Vague: "Under the administration of Leslie Palmer, the Notting Hill Peoples Carnival was transformed into an urban festival of black music, incorporating all aspects of Trinidad’s Carnival... getting sponsorship, recruiting more steel bands, reggae groups and sound systems, introducing generators and extending the route. The attendance went up accordingly from 3,000 at the beginning of the 70's to 30–50,000."Bill Tuckey, "In the beginning...", The Independent, 23 August 2002. 

Palmer encouraged traditional masquerade, and for the first time in 1973 costume bands and steel bands from the various islands took part in the street parade, alongside the introduction of stationary sound systems, as distinct from those on moving floats,Jamie Clifton, "Things You Never Knew About Carnival, London's Best Street Party", Vice, 21 August 2014. which as Alex Pascall has explained: "created the bridge between the two cultures of carnival, reggae and calypso." According to Claire Holder (Carnival organiser 1989–2002): "Leslie Palmer brought the Caribbean community together because at the time when he became chairman of the carnival it was a purely Trinidadian thing. Leslie said, ‘there are so many aspects to Caribbean culture and it should all be represented.’ That act alone didn't just bring people into carnival; it actually impacted on our whole perception as Carnival people. His impact went beyond Carnival. It had an impact upon our existence as black people in this country."

Palmer also arranged for photographs from the Carnival to be exhibited at London's Institute of Contemporary Arts.

1975 onwards
In late 1975, he took up a job working for Chris Blackwell's Island Records, promoting reggae worldwide and travelling with artists including Toots and the Maytals.Phil Gregory, "In Celebration of the 2012 Notting Hill Carnival TWO Blue Plaques will be unveiled to honour the Pioneering Fathers of Europe's largest Street festival", The Black Presence in Britain, 14 August 2012. Palmer went on to start his own management agency, representing young British acts such as Aswad, Steel Pulse, Janet Kay and Alton Ellis. Then with assistance from the Ministry of Labour he founded the Brent Black Music Co-op (BBMC) to mentor young musicians on getting ahead in the music industry, with Geraldine Connor as head of education. In the 1980s he had his own music career as an artist, performing and recording under the name Wounded Soldier."Banyan Archive Database".

He subsequently returned to teaching, retiring in 1996, after which he began to divide his time between London and the Caribbean. From his base in Bon Accord, Tobago, he wrote about the island for visitors, producing a popular magazine and a website, What's On ... in Tobago, and eventually compiling eight years of this work into a book entitled Tobago Exposed – The Essential Fun Guide."Tobago fun guide set for 2012 launch in Germany, London", Trinidad and Tobago Guardian, 30 November 2011.

Palmer heads the annual Notting Hill Carnival Pioneers (NHCP) Community Festival, established in 2013,"Notting Hill Carnival 2016 Pioneers Community Festival", Made in the Caribbean, 12 September 2016. YouTube video. now held in Horniman’s Park, Kensal Road.

Recognition and awards
On 24 August 2012, as part of a Notting Hill Carnival Weekend tribute, the Nubian Jak Community Trust organised the unveiling of two blue plaques at the junction of Tavistock Road known as "Carnival Square", to honour the contributions to the development of Carnival by steelpan musician Russell Henderson and Leslie Palmer.Berny Torre, "Leslie Palmer and Russell Henderson to be honoured", Operation Black Vote, 23 August 2012. The plaque to Palmer states that he "Pioneered the template for the modern Notting Hill Carnival, Helped transform a local community carnival into a nationally recognised event." Palmer remains the only living recipient so honoured.

His 70th birthday, coinciding with the 40th anniversary of "Carnival '73 Mas in the Ghetto", was celebrated on Portobello Green before the 2013 Carnival.

His contributions are detailed in the 2014 book Carnival: A Photographic and Testimonial History of the Notting Hill Carnival,"A Black History Month Special Oct 2014: Ishmahil Blagrove discusses his book ‘Carnival’", Flip the Script Book, 10 August 2014. which, as Kunle Olulode states in his review, "gives credit to many of the unsung heroes that brought the event together and provides a political and social context on its early days", noting that Palmer in his tenure as administrator of the Carnival "decided to expand its appeal by involving all the regional Caribbean communities.... Palmer's other innovation was encourage more masquerade elements which drew on the skills of Trinidad costume design legends Peter Minshall and Lawrence Noel."

Leslie Palmer makes a cameo appearance at the end of "We the Generation", the single featuring Mahalia from Rudimental's 2015 album of the same name.Cat Velez, "Rudimental 'We The Generation' by Yousef Eldin", Promo News, 1 October 2015.

In the 2017 New Year's Honours List, Palmer was honoured as an MBE "for services to Performance and the community in London".Mary-Lu Bakker,
 "MBE For Carnival Organiser", Notting Hill Post, 26 January 2017.

References

Further reading
 "Leslie Palmer, Mas in the Ghetto 1973", in Ishmahil Blagrove and Margaret Busby, Carnival: A Photographic and Testimonial History of the Notting Hill Carnival, Rice N Peas, 2014, pp. 94–117.

External links
 Notting Hill Carnival Pioneers official website.
 Leslie Palmer interviewed by Janet Spencer of Trinis in London at The Tabernacle, Ladbroke Grove, 2012. YouTube.
 "The origin and men who started the Notting Hill Carnival – part 3", 2011. YouTube.
 "The origin and men who started the Notting Hill Carnival – part 4", 2011. YouTube.
 "'73 Remembered: Leslie Palmer & The Notting Hill Carnival", Westwaytv, 2 August 2013
 Portobello Radio: "Greg Weir chats with Leslie Palmer about the Carnival Pioneers Event 13 Aug 2017".
 David Simpson, Spice, sunshine and bassline': Notting Hill carnival's history – told through its greatest anthems | Leslie Palmer MBE, organiser, 1970s", The Guardian, 24 August 2018.
 Leslie Palmer, Samuel Fishwick, "Leslie Palmer: Notting Hill Carnival is for people to be whoever they want for the day", Evening Standard'', 24 August 2018.

1943 births
Living people
20th-century Trinidad and Tobago male singers
20th-century Trinidad and Tobago singers
Black British activists
British community activists
Calypsonians
Members of the Order of the British Empire
Trinidad and Tobago emigrants to the United Kingdom
Trinidad and Tobago writers